is a passenger railway station operated by the Takamatsu-Kotohira Electric Railroad in the city of Sanuki, Kagawa, Japan.  It is operated by the private transportation company Takamatsu-Kotohira Electric Railroad (Kotoden) and is designated station "N17".

Lines
Nagao Station is a terminus of the Kotoden Nagao Line and is located 14.6 km from the opposing terminus of the line at Kawaramachi Station and 16.3 kilometers from Takamatsu-Chikkō Station.

Layout
The station consists of a single side platform serving one track. An additional storage track is situated on the north side. The station is unattended.

Adjacent stations

History
Nagao Station opened on 30 April 1912.

Surrounding area
Nagao-ji (Temple No.87 on the Shikoku Pilgrimage)
Sanuki City Hall Nagao Branch Office (former Nagao Town Hall)
Sanuki Municipal Nagao Elementary School

See also
 List of railway stations in Japan

References

External links

  

Railway stations in Japan opened in 1912
Railway stations in Kagawa Prefecture
Stations of Takamatsu-Kotohira Electric Railroad
Sanuki, Kagawa